Naval Decoy IDS300 (Inflatable Decoy System) is a passive, off-board, octahedral, corner reflector decoy of the Royal Navy's Type 45 destroyer and the US Navy's  destroyer, forming part of a layered defence to counter anti-ship missiles.  Unlike chaff, the decoy is persistent and will float for up to three hours in sea state 4.

Jane's was first to report the United Kingdom was looking for a new floating decoy as part of a program known as the Naval Passive Off-Board Decoy (N-POD), on March 3, 2019.  In US Navy service, it is designated as the Mk 59 decoy launching system. The system is made by Irvin Aerospace Ltd, Hertfordshire in the United Kingdom.

Deployment
The decoy is launched out of a deck-mounted tube and self-inflates on the sea surface before being released to free-float past the stern to mimic a ship's radar and radio signatures. The deployment and inflation process takes seconds and the decoy is completely independent, requiring no further input from the ship. Typical ship fitment is four launchers, fitted using eight bolts and an electrical feed. The system is most effective in littoral waters with a calm sea state.

See also

 AN/SLQ-49 Chaff Buoy Decoy System
 Electronic countermeasure
 Electronic warfare
 Nulka

References

External links
 Naval Decoy IDS300 deployed - YouTube
 Images

Military decoys
Naval warfare
Weapons countermeasures
Defence Science and Technology Organisation